Uhlans were a type of light cavalry, primarily armed with a  lance. While first appearing in the cavalry of Lithuania and then Poland, Uhlans were quickly adopted by the mounted forces of other countries, including France, Russia, Prussia, Saxony and Austria-Hungary.

Uhlans traditionally wore a double-breasted short-tailed jacket with a coloured 'plastron' panel at the front, a coloured sash, and a square-topped Polish lancer cap (also called ). This cap or cavalry helmet was derived from a traditional design of Polish cap, formalised and stylised for military use. Their lances were traditionally topped with a small, swallow-tailed flag (pennon) just below the spearhead.

Etymology 
There are several suggested etymologies for the word uhlan. In the Turkic languages, oğlan means young man or boy. It is probable that this entered Polish via Tatar or Turkish and was styled as ułan. The Polish spelling was then adopted by German, French and other European languages.

History

Origins 
In the late 14th century, Golden Horde Tatar (sometimes spelt as "Tartar") families settled in Lithuania and so were required to serve the Grand Duke of Lithuania militarily and later the Polish king. The Poles started incorporating much of their military vocabulary and traditions, along with their strategy and tactics. Lithuanian Tatars, mostly Muslim, served as part of the Royal armies during various battles of the late Middle Ages. Their tasks were to conduct reconnaissance in advance of the heavier cavalry banners (knights). With the end of armoured knights during the 16th century, the Lithuanian Tatars were organized in light (Tatar) banners – armed with a light lance, bow, sabre, and on occasion, a battle axe or horseman's pick, serving as companions and retainers – while equally lightly armed hussars were converted into heavy companies of winged hussars. Tatar companions serving within their own Tatar companies (banners) lasted until the 1770s, when major cavalry reforms were carried out within the Polish–Lithuanian army and were included in the reformed cavalry regiments. The last Polish King, Stanisław August Poniatowski, had an uhlan guard regiment simply known as the Royal Uhlans. It was disbanded in 1794 or 1795.

Pennons were attached to the lances by the original Lithuanian Lancers to look more awe-inspiring.

18th century
The next year, the squadron was expanded to an uhlan regiment, finally being transformed into Natzmer's 4th Hussar Regiment in 1742.

Simultaneously, in 1743, Maurice de Saxe formed a mixed uhlan-dragoon regiment, the Volontaires de Saxe, for Louis XV's French Royal Army. It was composed of six companies, each of eighty dragoons and eighty uhlans, and included Lithuanian, Polish and Tatar soldiers. The regiment was known for its bravery, fighting spirit, and alcoholism.

The first uhlan regiments were created in the early 18th century, during the 1720s, in the Polish–Lithuanian Commonwealth.

As developments in battlefield tactics and firearms had combined with the increasing sizes of early modern armies to make heavy armour obsolescent (though retained by the cuirassier regiments), lighter units became the core of the cavalry, distinguished only by the sizes of their men and mounts and by the tasks that they performed (i.e., reconnaissance, skirmishing, or direct charges).

During the period preceding the Partitions of Poland, uhlan formations consisting of Poles or Lithuanian Tatars were created in most surrounding states simply because the Polish Crown did not have the resources or political will to maintain a numerous army. Speed and mobility were the keys to the effectiveness of light cavalry armed with lances.

This unit became the prototype for many other units of the Polish cavalry, who started to arm themselves with equipment modelled after uhlan regiments and medieval Tatars.

In the Polish–Lithuanian Commonwealth, the uhlans inherited the status and traditions of the winged Polish hussars in 1776, thus becoming National cavalry. The Austrian empire also formed an "Uhlan Regiment" in 1784, composed primarily of Poles. Uhlan regiments recruited from Austrian cavalrymen were raised in 1791.

19th century
During the Napoleonic Wars, the Duchy of Warsaw raised uhlan formations. Polish lancers serving with the French Army included the Legion of the Vistula and the 1st Polish Light Cavalry Regiment of the Imperial Guard. The Imperial Guard lancers were armed with Lances, Sabres and Pistols. The lancers of the Polish expeditionary corps, which fought alongside the French in Spain and Germany, spread the popularity of the Polish model of light cavalry. After the Battle of Somosierra, Napoleon said that one Polish cavalryman was worth 10 French soldiers. The chevaux-légers, French light cavalry units from the 16th century till 1815, were remodelled after the uhlans. Following the Treaty of Tilsit in 1807, lancer regiments designated as uhlans were reintroduced in the Prussian service. Initially, they were only three. After the War of the Sixth Coalition, uhlan regiments were formed from Lützow Free Corps, Schill Free Corps, Bremen Volunteers and Hellwig's Streifkorps.

During and after the Napoleonic Wars, cavalry regiments armed with lances were formed in many states throughout Europe, including the armies of Italy, Spain, Portugal, Sweden and Russia. While cavalry carrying this weapon was usually specifically designated as lancers or uhlans, in some instances, the front rank troopers of hussar or dragoon regiments were also armed with lances.

In one notable action during the Waterloo Campaign as the French lancers advanced out of a defile — created by the bridge over the Dyle and the village of Genappe — although they were stationary as they formed up, they lowered their lances to receive a charge by the sabre wielding British 7th Hussars (light cavalry) who were then unable to press home their charge. However, once the lancers advanced in slight disorder (up the valley slope of the Dyle), they were overridden by the British 1st Life Guards (heavy cavalry armed with sabres) who drove them back through Genappe and onto the bridge.

During the Battle of Albuera, the 1st Vistulan Lancers Regiment in French service virtually annihilated three of four of the British infantry regiments comprising Colborne's 1st Brigade. In 1816, the British Army established its own lancer regiments, converting four light dragoon regiments for the purpose and practically adopting the whole uniform of Napoleon's famous Polish Lancers, including the czapska.The traditions of the Polish uhlans were preserved during the Kingdom of Poland. They fought both in the November uprising of 1830 and in the January uprising of 1863. Uhlans were deployed in the Franco-Prussian War by the Prussian Army in a variety of traditional light cavalry roles. During the siege of Paris, uhlans were tasked with shadowing passenger balloons launched from the city: their capacity for rapid movement made uhlans the only troops able to keep pace with the balloons, either to seize them on landing or at least report trajectory and destination.

World War I
At the start of the First World War, many European armies had lance-armed cavalry regiments. Belgium had five lancer regiments. Italy possessed 10 lancer regiments. Great Britain had six lancer regiments, with an additional 15 in the army of the British Raj.

German uhlans

In 1914, the Imperial German Army included 26 uhlan regiments, three of which were Guard regiments, 21 line (16 Prussian, two Württemberg and three Saxon) and two from the autonomous Royal Bavarian Army. All German uhlan regiments wore Polish style czapkas and tunics with plastron fronts, both in coloured parade uniforms and the field grey service dress introduced in 1910. Because German hussar, dragoon and cuirassier regiments also carried lances in 1914, there was a tendency among their French and British opponents to describe all German cavalry as "uhlans".

The lance carried below its head a small pennant in different colours according to the province or state from which the regiment was recruited. The butt end of the shaft was also pointed so that (in theory) the lance could be wielded as a double-ended weapon.

After seeing mounted action during the early weeks of World War I, the uhlan regiments were either dismounted to serve as "cavalry rifles" in the trenches of the Western Front or transferred to the Eastern Front where more primitive conditions made it possible for horse cavalry to play a useful role still. All 26 German uhlan regiments were disbanded in 1918–1919.

Austrian uhlans
There were 11 regiments of uhlans (spelt "Ulan") in the Austro-Hungarian cavalry, largely recruited in the Polish-speaking parts of the Empire. They wore czapkas in regimental colours but otherwise were, after 1867, dressed in the light blue tunics and red breeches of the Austro-Hungarian dragoons, without Polish features. Their lances were similar in design to those of the German cavalry but had wooden shafts (of ash). In 1884 the lance was replaced by the sabre in the Austro-Hungarian cavalry, although the  regiments retained their traditional titles and lancer caps until World War I.
 
As with other armies, the Austro-Hungarian uhlans were forced into a largely dismounted role by the realities of trench warfare by the end of 1914. Consequently, the blue and red peacetime uniforms were replaced by field grey during 1915. There was, however, one last opportunity for traditional glory when on 21 August 1914, the uhlans and dragoons of the Austro-Hungarian  clashed with their counterparts of the Imperial Russian 10th Cavalry Division in classic cavalry style at the Battle of Jaroslavice.

Polish uhlans
Józef Piłsudski's Polish Legions (an independent formation serving with the Austro-Hungarian Army) had a small uhlan detachment. Commanded by Władysław Belina-Prażmowski, they were modelled after the uhlans of the Napoleonic period. This unit was the first element of the Central Powers to enter Polish lands during World War I. After Poland's independence in 1918, all parts of the country raised uhlan formations. They fought with distinction in the Greater Poland Uprising, the Polish-Ukrainian War and the Polish-Bolshevik War. Although equipped with modern horse-drawn artillery and trained in infantry tactics, the uhlan formations kept their sabres, their lances and their ability to charge the enemy. Among other battles, the uhlan units took part in the Battle of Komarów of 1920 against the invading Soviet Konarmia, the last pure cavalry battle in history.

Russian uhlans
The Imperial Russian Army had converted its 17 line uhlan regiments to dragoons in 1881 as part of the general modernization of the Russian cavalry. Only the two Russian Imperial Guard uhlan regiments retained their special distinctions. In 1910, however, the historic line regiments of uhlans had their lances, traditional titles, and distinctive ceremonial uniforms returned to them.  From 1910 to 1918, the designation of "uhlan" had, however, become simply a historical distinction in the Russian cavalry (many of whom carried lances), without tactical significance.

Interwar
In the period between the world wars, the Polish cavalry was reformed, with some units retaining their uhlan traditions. However, in contrast with its traditional role, the cavalry was no longer seen as a unit capable of breaking through enemy lines. Instead, it was used as a mobile reserve and employed infantry tactics: the soldiers dismounted before the battle and fought as infantry (dragoon), yet retained the high mobility of cavalry. Thus, technically speaking, in 1939, Poland had 11 brigades of mounted infantry and no cavalry units.

As noted above, the uhlans of the Imperial German Army were disbanded at the end of World War I. However, lances continued to be carried by certain cavalry regiments of the new German Army permitted by the Treaty of Versailles. As late as 1925, Major General von Seeckt, Commander of the Reichsheer, rejected a General Staff proposal that lances be abandoned as unsuited for a modern army.

World War II
While the Polish cavalrymen retained their sabres, the lance was no longer a standard issue after 1934 (or 1937). However, the lance was retained only for training purposes and flying squadron pennants. Instead, the cavalry units were equipped with 75mm field guns, light tanks, 37mm anti-tank guns, 40mm anti-aircraft guns, as well as anti-tank rifles and other modern weapons. Although there were cavalry charges during World War II, very few were successful.

A popular myth is that Polish cavalry armed with lances charged (and were annihilated by) German tanks during the September 1939 campaign. This arose from the misreporting (both intentional and unintentional) of the Charge at Krojanty on 1 September, when the 18th Pomeranian Uhlan Regiment's two squadrons armed with sabres, scattered German infantry before being caught in the open by German armoured cars.

When the remnants of the Polish cavalry forces were reconstituted in exile in 1943 as the 1st Armoured Division the 24th Uhlans (24 Pułk Ułanów) were equipped as an armoured regiment with Sherman tanks. The regiment was disbanded in 1947.

Modern

Present-day military units with the title or historical role of "uhlans" include:
 Kazakhstan:  regiments exist in the modern Kazakhstan Army though not as mounted cavalry.
 Poland: Presidential Mounted Cavalry Squadron of Polish Armed Forces
 Lithuania: Grand Duchess Birutė Uhlan Battalion this unit has the historic title, but not the cavalry role. It is a combat battalion.

In popular culture

Video games 

 In Final Fantasy XII: The Zodiac Age, one of the 12 playable character classes is named "Uhlan" and wields Lances and Spears.
 Many light to medium Battlemech and combined arms regiments in the BattleTech/MechWarrior universe use uhlans in their unit names (e.g., the 1st Kathil Uhlans).
 Age of Empires III: uhlans are the primary cavalry unit of the German civilization.
 Mount & Blade: With Fire & Sword: A lance-armed light cavalryman called an "oglan" can be found in service of the Crimean Khanate.

Literature and film 

Uhlans are mentioned in Arthur Conan Doyle's short story "The Lord of Chateau Noir".
The 19th century German pulp-fiction novel  (″The Uhlan's Love″) by Karl May has, like everything else by this author, acquired cult status in German-speaking countries and, although several thousand pages long, is still in print.
In Leo Tolstoy's seminal work War and Peace, uhlans appear several times from the start of Book III.
In Guy de Maupassant's short story "Father Milon", 16 uhlan soldiers of the Prussian army are killed by the old protagonist, Father Milon. 
In Joseph Roth's 1932 novel The Radeztky March, the protagonist is an officer of the Austro-Hungarian uhlans.
In the 1943 film The Life and Death of Colonel Blimp, Theo Kretschmar-Schuldorff is an officer of the uhlans. 
In Graham Greene's 1958 novel Our Man in Havana, Dr. Hasselbacher is an ex-uhlan officer.
In Gunther Grass's 1959 novel The Tin Drum, the protagonist Oskar Matzerath frequently refers to the Polish uhlans as well as their misreported charge on 1 September 1939.
 In Italo Calvino's 1979 novel If on a winter's night a traveler, Gritzvi (Outside the town of Malbork) prizes his uhlan helmet and is reluctant to leave it in Ponko's care.
 In the science fiction short story He Walked Around the Horses by H. Beam Piper, Prussian uhlans play an important role, it is they who first meet the diplomat Benjamin Bathurst who had slipped from our world into an Alternative History timeline. 
 Anton Hofmiller, the narrator of Stefan Zweig's Beware of Pity, is an officer in an uhlan regiment in 1913 Austro-Hungary.
 Battle Picture Weekly's popular feature "Charley's War", by Pat Mills & Joe Colquhoun, had uhlans playing a major role in episodes 252 & 253.
In Star Trek the Romulan equivalent of an ensign is an uhlan.

Culture 

 Traditional Polish and Ukrainian song .

Sports and organisations 

 "Black Uhlan of the Rhine" – the nickname of a heavyweight champion Max Schmeling.
 Valparaiso University's sports teams were nicknamed "Uhlans" until World War II, then changed to "Crusaders".
 The Black Uhlans is the name of one of Australia's Outlaw motorcycle clubs that has been active since 1970.

See also

 Hussar
 Lancer
 Polish cavalry
 Dragoon
 Cuirassier

Notes

References

Further reading

 
 Marrion, R.J. (1975), Lancers and Dragoons, Almark Publishing Company Ltd., .

External links
 The Uhlan
 Etymology OnLine

Cavalry
Polish cavalry
18th- and 19th-century warrior types
Turkish words and phrases